Saurabh Singh (born 11 October 1997) is an Indian cricketer. He made his List A debut for Bengal in the 2016–17 Vijay Hazare Trophy on 6 March 2017. He made his first-class debut on 11 January 2020, for Railways in the 2019–20 Ranji Trophy.

References

External links
 

1997 births
Living people
Indian cricketers
Bengal cricketers
Railways cricketers
Place of birth missing (living people)